The Gibson Chet Atkins SST was a solid body acoustic-electric designed by the musician Chet Atkins and manufactured and marketed by Gibson. The steel-string model was introduced in 1987 and was discontinued in 2006. The Chet Atkins CE was the original nylon string version of 1982 and possibly the first of its kind.

Design
The SST was a design that combined Gibson's steel-string acoustic and electric guitar technology.

The guitar had a solid spruce or cedar top and a mahogany body. Unlike most acoustic-electrics, the SST had no resonating chamber or soundhole. The acoustic sound came from a bridge mounted transducer manufactured by L.R. Baggs for Gibson with a proprietary active pre-amp. The SST had controls for volume as well as boost and cut for both treble and bass signals.

The SST was offered in five finishes:  natural, ebony, white, burgundy and cherry sunburst. It had mother of pearl inlays on the fretboard, headstock, and bridge and features gold plated hardware. Early models had an ornate headstock and a fake sound hole with the knobs mounted on the front of the guitar. Later models had star inlays and a Les Paul style headstock. It also sports Chet Atkins's signature above the fretboard.

Popular use
The SST quickly became popular among rock and country players because high volume levels could be reached without any feedback, whereas most traditional acoustic electrics will emit moderate to high levels of feedback when they come near amplifiers, speakers or microphones. This ability made the SST suitable acoustic guitar for live music.

Notable SST Players

 Chet Atkins
 Waylon Jennings
 David Crowder
 Keziah Jones
 Lindsey Buckingham
 Johnny Marr
 Emerson Hart
 Patricia Kelly
 Tonino Baliardo
 Dave Matthews
 Jorma Kaukonen
 Keller Williams
 David Gilmour
 Steve Earle
 Raine Maida
 Emmylou Harris
 Clint Black
 Joe Diffie
 Travis Tritt
 Zakk Wylde
 Janick Gers
 Moraes Moreira
 Robert Smith
 Joaquín Sabina
 Charlie Daniels

References

External links

 Related article on Epiphone Wiki

Chet Atkins
Chet Atkins
Products introduced in 1987
1987 in music